Hanalei means "lei making" or "crescent bay" in Hawaiian. It may refer to:

Features on Kauai
 Hanalei, Hawaii, a village (census-designated place)
 Hanalei River
 Hanalei Bay
 Hanalei National Wildlife Refuge
 Hanalei Pier, on the National Register of Historic Places

Other uses
Hanalei (band), an American indie rock band